Prasophyllum colensoi is a species of orchid endemic to New Zealand where it is commonly known as the leek orchid. It has a single tubular, dark green leaf and up to twenty scented, yellowish-green to reddish-brown flowers. It is similar to P. hectori, the only other species of Prasophyllum found in New Zealand, but is distinguished from it by its smaller size, fewer flowers and different habitat.

Description
As with others in the genus, the flowers are inverted so that the labellum is above the column rather than below it. The lateral sepals are linear to lance-shaped, about the same size as the dorsal sepal or slightly narrower and almost parallel to each other. There is a thick, fleshy callus in the centre of the labellum. Flowering occurs from October to March.

Taxonomy and naming
Prasophyllum colensoi was first formally described in 1853 by Joseph Dalton Hooker and the description was published in The botany of the Antarctic voyage of H.M. discovery ships Erebus and Terror in the Years 1839-1843. The specific epithet (colensoi) honours William Colenso.

Distribution and habitat
This leek orchid is widespread on both the North and South Islands of New Zealand where it grows in grassland, between herbs and around the edge of bogs.

References

External links 
 
 

colensoi
Endemic orchids of New Zealand
Plants described in 1853